Rindfleisch means beef in German. It is a German surname that may refer to:
The leader of the medieval Rintfleisch massacres
Aric Rindfleisch, American marketing author
Eduard von Rindfleisch (1836–1908), German pathologist and histologist 
Jan Rindfleisch, American art curator

German-language surnames